In the colonial societies of the Americas and Australia, a quadroon or quarteron was a person with one quarter African/Aboriginal and three quarters European ancestry.

Similar classifications were octoroon for one-eighth black (Latin root octo-, means "eight") and quintroon for one-sixteenth black.

Governments of the time sometimes incorporated the terms in law, defining rights and restrictions. The use of such terminology is a characteristic of hypodescent, which is the practice within a society of assigning children of mixed unions to the ethnic group which the dominant group perceives as being subordinate. The racial designations refer specifically to the number of full-blooded African ancestors or equivalent, emphasizing the quantitative least, with quadroon signifying that a person has one-quarter black ancestry.

Etymology
The word quadroon was borrowed from the French quarteron and the Spanish cuarterón, both of which have their root in the Latin quartus, meaning "a quarter".

Similarly, the Spanish cognate cuarterón is used to describe cuarterón de mulato or morisco (someone whose racial origin is three-quarters white and one-quarter black) and cuarterón de mestizo or castizo, (someone whose racial origin is three-quarters white and one-quarter Amerindian), especially in Caribbean South America.

Racial classifications
Quadroon was used to designate a person of one-quarter African/Aboriginal ancestry, that is equivalent to one biracial parent (African/Aboriginal and Caucasian) and one white or European parent; in other words, the equivalent of one African/Aboriginal grandparent and three White or European grandparents. In Latin America, which had a variety of terms for racial groups, some terms for quadroons were morisco or chino, see casta. Terceroon was a term synonymous with quadroon, derived from being three generations of descent from an African ancestor, counting the ancestor as the first generation.

The term mulatto was used to designate a person who was biracial, with one fully black parent and one fully white parent, or a person whose parents are both mulatto. In some cases, it was used as a general term, for instance on U.S. census classifications, to refer to all persons of mixed race, without regard for proportion of ancestries.

The term octoroon referred to a person with one-eighth African/Aboriginal ancestry; that is, someone with family heritage equivalent to one biracial grandparent; in other words, one African great-grandparent and seven European great-grandparents. An example was Russian poet Alexander Pushkin. As with the use of quadroon, this word was applied to a limited extent in Australia for those of one-eighth Aboriginal ancestry, as the government implemented assimilation policies on the Stolen Generations. The term mustee was also used to refer to a person with one-eighth African ancestry. 

The term sacatra was used to refer to one who was seven-eighths black or African and one-eighth white or European (i.e. an individual with one black and one griffe parent, or one white great-grandparent).

The term mustefino refers to a person with one-sixteenth African ancestry. The terms quintroon or hexadecaroon were also used.

In the French Antilles, the following terms were used during the 18th century:

In Latin America, the terms griffe or sambo were sometimes used for an individual of three-quarters black parentage, i.e. the child of a mulatto parent and a fully black parent.

Depiction in media

In the pre-war period,  mixed-race slaves  with predominantly white features were depicted in photos and other media to show whites that some slaves   were visually indistinguishable from themselves, thus preventing them from seeing slaves as an ethnic "other" in order to further the abolition movement.

See also

 Afro-Latin American
 Anglo-Indian
 Indian South Africans
 Baster
 Casta
 Children of the plantation
 Discrimination based on skin color a.k.a. Colorism
 High yellow
 Miscegenation
 Mischling
 Multiracial
 Passing (racial identity)
 Racial hygiene
 Sacatra

References

Multiracial affairs
Mulatto
African-American people